HTC Desire is a series of Android smartphones designed and manufactured by HTC. All products in the Desire series were designed to be affordable, touchscreen-based and slate-sized, and run the Android mobile operating system (Android 2.1 Eclair or subsequent Android releases) with the HTC Sense graphical user interface except for the HTC Desire 616, HTC Desire 516. HTC Desire 310 and HTC Desire 210, all of which feature a mixed user interface of HTC Sense and the Android Open Source Project.

2010
 HTC Desire, the first ever phone in the Desire lineup
 HTC Desire HD, which included a larger and higher resolution screen
 HTC Desire Z, Released in November 2010, features a slide-out QWERTY keyboard

2011
 HTC Desire S, the follow up to the original HTC Desire

2012
 HTC Desire C, a low-end device
 HTC Desire V, a larger screen, higher clock speed variant of the HTC Desire C
 HTC Desire VC, a CDMA variant of the HTC Desire V
 HTC Desire VT, another HTC Desire V variant for China
 HTC Desire X, similar to the HTC Desire V but with a faster, dual-core processor
 HTC Desire SV, has the same specs as the HTC Desire X but with a larger, 4.3 Inch screen
 HTC Desire 400, similar to the HTC Desire SV but with a 5 MP Camera and two SIM card slots
 HTC Desire SU, a Chinese variant of the HTC Desire 400

2013

 HTC Desire U, a low-end device released in China
 HTC Desire Q, another low-end device for China
 HTC Desire L, a lower mid-range device with a dual-core processor. Released in China
 HTC Desire P, with the same specs as the HTC Desire L but with an 8 MP camera
 HTC Desire 600, a mid-range offering with a quad-core processor and two SIM card slots
  HTC Desire 200, a low-end phone available worldwide
 HTC Desire 500, similar to the HTC Desire 600 but with a smaller, 4.3 Inch screen
 HTC Desire 601, a higher mid-range device with LTE capabilities
 HTC Desire 300, a smaller variant of the HTC Desire 601 with a 4.3 Inch screen
 HTC Desire 700, a large 5 Inch mid-range phone with two SIM card slots
 HTC Desire 501, a lower mid-range device

2014

 HTC Desire Eye, first Desire series phone with high-end flagship specs and a 13-megapixel front camera with a host of new camera features 
 HTC Desire 828
 HTC Desire 820, improvement to the Desire 816
 HTC Desire 816, the first Phablet in the Desire line with higher mid-range specs
 HTC Desire 620, improvement to Desire 616
 HTC Desire 616, the first HTC device with an octa-core processor
 HTC Desire 610, a mid-ranger with a smaller 4.7 Inch screen
 HTC Desire 516, a similar phone to the Desire 610 but with the AOSP UI instead of HTC Sense
 HTC Desire 310, a budget device with a quad-core processor
 HTC Desire 210, a low-end device

2016
 HTC Desire 10 Pro
 HTC Desire 10 Lifestyle
 HTC Desire 830
 HTC Desire 825
 HTC Desire 728 Ultra
 HTC Desire 650
 HTC Desire 628
 HTC Desire 625
 HTC Desire 530

2017 

 HTC Desire 10 Compact

2018
 HTC Desire 12 comes with affordable price tag 
 HTC Desire 12+
 HTC Desire 12s

2019 

 HTC Desire 19+
 HTC Desire 19s

2020 

 HTC Desire 20 Pro, Budgeted Desire smartphone for 2020.
 HTC Desire 20+, Another Desire series budget smartphone for 2020

2021 

 Desire 21 Pro 5G, First 5G smartphone in the 2021 HTC Desire series lineup with 90 Hz display.

2022 

 HTC Desire 22 Pro

Comparison
This table is primarily intended to show the differences between the models of the Desire series:

References 

Desire series
One
Android (operating system) devices
Windows Phone devices